"Dim All the Lights" is a song by American recording artist Donna Summer released as the third single from her 1979 album Bad Girls. It debuted at number 70 on August 25, 1979, and peaked that year at number two on November 10 and November 17 on the Billboard Hot 100. It was blocked from becoming the third number one hit from the album first by "Heartache Tonight" by the Eagles for one week, then by "Still" by Commodores the next week. Produced by her longtime collaborator Giorgio Moroder with Pete Bellotte, the track combines Summer's trademark disco beats with a more soulful pop sound. It was the third Hot 100 top-two single from the album and her sixth consecutive Hot 100 top-five single.

Background
Prior to the release of "Dim All the Lights", Summer had released "Hot Stuff" and "Bad Girls" and, later, the "No More Tears (Enough Is Enough)" duet with Barbra Streisand, all of which reached number one on the Billboard Hot 100. "Dim All the Lights" also became another massive hit for her. Overseas, it peaked at number 29 on the UK Singles Chart. Like "Hot Stuff" and "Bad Girls" before, Summers' "Dim All the Lights" and "No More Tears" were simultaneously in the top three. Summer was the first female artist to achieve that feat.

"Dim All the Lights" was Summer's only hit single that she wrote alone. She had originally considered giving the song to Rod Stewart but changed her mind. The song was nominated for Best Disco Recording at the 22nd Grammy Awards in 1980. The song caused a rift between Donna and Casablanca label president Neil Bogart, who had promised to wait a month longer than he did before releasing Summer's duet with Barbra Streisand, to allow "Dim" to peak first.

The recording is remarkable for a sustained note held by Summer for 16 seconds, temporarily holding a record until Streisand broke it a few years later.

The record's flipside, "There Will Always Be a You," was also written alone by Summer. It also received some airplay and was charted as an album cut on some North American radio stations (notably CKLW in Windsor, Ontario, where it reached number two in October 1979; "Dim All the Lights" failed to chart prominently on that station).

Reception
Billboard rated the song one the sexiest ever recorded, saying it, "sounds like a nice song to sway to at the prom. But the groove becomes decidedly horizontal once the song hits the bridge and she demands her lover to 'use me all up / take me bottom to top'. Cash Box said the song was "original and intriguing," with a "surging disco beat." Record World said it "explodes into a joyous disco-pop dancer."

Smash Hits said it, "has a slow intro which breaks into the familiar beat while she holds a note for two hours. There's piano, echo, and lots of backing vocals."

Official versions
 Album version – 4:40
 7" version – 3:59
 12" version – 7:09

Charts

Weekly charts

Year-end charts

Certifications and sales

Laura Branigan version

Laura Branigan had a Top 40 Dance hit in 1995 with her cover version. The single version appears on her US hits collection, The Best of Branigan. While Branigan's version was released in several mixes by Atlantic Records, a popular version in some Hi-NRG clubs at the time came from the DJ-only label Hot Tracks, which gave clubgoers two singers in one song, editing Donna Summer's original in with Branigan's remake. A video for the single, showing Branigan surrounded by a bevy of drag queens (Miss Understood, Hedda Lettuce and Vivacious), was her last, and the release was the end of her association with the label, as she left the music industry to care for her husband, who had been diagnosed with cancer.

Track listings

Charts

Other recordings
 In 2007, the song was sampled for "B.E.A.T.", a re-edit of "D.A.N.C.E." by the French electronic duo Justice.
 In 2018, the song was included in the Broadway theatre production of Summer: The Donna Summer Musical.

References

Donna Summer songs
1979 singles
Laura Branigan songs
1995 singles
Songs written by Donna Summer
Casablanca Records singles
Atlantic Records singles
Song recordings produced by Giorgio Moroder
Song recordings produced by Pete Bellotte
1979 songs